The Ajdanovac Monastery is a Serbian Orthodox Monastery, located in the same-named village of Ajdanovac, on the slopes of Jastrebac, in south-east Serbia. It was probably built somewhere after the Ottoman invasion of the Balkans in the year 1485. It went under renovation in 1887 and served as a parish up to 1936 when it became a monastery again.

References

1485 establishments in Europe
1936 establishments in Serbia
Monasteries in Serbia
Serbian Orthodox monasteries in Serbia
Cultural Monuments of Great Importance (Serbia)